The United States House of Representatives elections in California, 1894 was an election for California's delegation to the United States House of Representatives, which occurred as part of the general election of the House of Representatives on November 6, 1894. Republicans picked up three Democratic-held districts and the lone Populist open seat.

Overview

Delegation Composition

Results

District 1

District 2

District 3

District 4

District 5

District 6

District 7

See also
54th United States Congress
Political party strength in California
Political party strength in U.S. states
United States House of Representatives elections, 1894

References
California Elections Page
Office of the Clerk of the House of Representatives

External links
California Legislative District Maps (1911-Present)
RAND California Election Returns: District Definitions

1894
California
California United States House of Representatives